The Renault Arkana is a compact crossover SUV (C-segment) with a sloping rear roofline produced by the French manufacturer Renault. The car debuted in May 2019 in Russia as a car based on the older Dacia/Renault Duster B0 platform. Another separate version of the vehicle was introduced in South Korea in February 2020 as the Renault Samsung XM3 (Renault XM3 since 2022), and is based on a more advanced CMF-B platform. The latter version of the Arkana was later introduced in core European market in September 2020.

Renault stated the name "Arkana" derives from the Latin arcanum, meaning secret.

Design
The Renault Arkana's interior is laid out in a similar way to the cabins in the Renault Zoe and Clio. There's a pronounced centre console with three heating and ventilation controls ahead of the gear selector, and a digital driver's display behind the steering wheel. This screen measures 4.2, 7.0 or 10.2 inches, depending on which model you pick, and is joined by a 7.0- or 9.3-inch portrait central touchscreen. The Renault Arkana is the brand's first coupé SUV and is available as a hybrid from the outset.

Versions

LJC

Russia

The Arkana debuted in Russia in May 2019. For the Russian market, it is assembled by Renault Russia at its Moscow plant and its unveiling took place at the 2018 Moscow International Automobile Salon through a near-production showcar. The car has a coupe-like styling. The Russian Arkana is built on the Renault B0+ platform, a heavily revised variant of the B0 platform used by models such as the Kaptur and the Duster. The Russian model is using the 1.3-litre turbo petrol engine paired with Jatco CVT8 transmission.

Kazakhstan
Assembly in neighboring Kazakhstan began in 2021 at SaryarkaAvtoProm plant (Kostanay), through a partnership between Renault and the Allur Group.

LJL

South Korea
The car was launched in South Korea as the Renault Samsung XM3. Instead of riding above the B0 platform like the Russian Arkana, the XM3 uses the modular platform CMF-B and is related to the second-generation Renault Captur. The XM3 is also purely a front-wheel drive car unlike its B0-based counterpart. The CMF-based variant is 25 mm longer than the B0-based Arkana sold in Russia. The South Korean model has two engine option either the 1.3-litre turbo petrol engine with 7-speed EDC gearbox or 1.6-litre petrol engine with Jatco CVT7 transmission.

Europe

In September 2020, the rebadged version of South Korean-made Samsung XM3 was also launched in Western and Central Europe markets as the Renault Arkana. It is introduced in former Yugoslavian countries as the Renault Mégane Conquest, as its original name may be associated with Željko Ražnatović Arkan, the late Serbian criminal, politician and paramilitary commander during the Yugoslav Wars who was accused of numerous war crimes.

The European model is equipped with a mild hybrid 1.3-litre turbo petrol engine paired with the 7-speed EDC gearbox.

Sales

XM3 Inspire

A show car based on the Arkana, the XM3 Inspire, was introduced by Renault subsidiary Renault Samsung Motors and unveiled at the 2019 Seoul Motor Show. The main differences with the Arkana are a redesigned front grille, a different colour scheme and a revised bodywork.

References

Arkana
Cars introduced in 2019
2020s cars
Compact sport utility vehicles
Crossover sport utility vehicles
Front-wheel-drive vehicles
All-wheel-drive vehicles
Hybrid electric cars
Plug-in hybrid vehicles
Partial zero-emissions vehicles
Vehicles with CVT transmission